Rosenblum Cup is an Open Teams event held every four years as part of the World Bridge Championships. The event was added to the world championships in New Orleans in 1978 to commemorate Julius Rosenblum, who served as president of the World Bridge Federation (WBF) until 1976. A similar event for women, the McConnell Cup, which takes place alongside the Rosenblum Cup was added in 1994.

The full name of this championship is World Open Knockout Teams. The knockout format pertains only to the late stages, however, evidently a six-round knockout with 64 teams in recent renditions. It appears that the field has been divided into sixteen groups for round-robin play, with the top four advancing from each group to the knockout stage.

Results

* Michniewski in 1978, Angelini in 1998, and Ferraro in 2002 did not play enough boards in order to qualify for the title of World Champion
** Zakaris in 1986 and Borewicz–Otvosi in 1994 did not play enough boards in order to qualify for second place

References

External links
 World Open KO Teams 1978–present (table) at the World Bridge Federation

Contract bridge world competitions